The Punta de Choros Metamorphic Complex is a large coherent group of metamorphic rocks –in other words a geologic complex– of the Chilean Coast Range in northern Chile. It consists mainly of micaschists, greenschists and other low-grade metasediment. The complex was formed by the metamorphism of sediments and associated mafic rocks at the interface between a subducting plate and the overriding plate.

References

Lithodemic units of Chile
Geology of Atacama Region
Geology of Coquimbo Region
Metamorphic complexes